Menggong Town is an urban town in Xinhua County, Hunan Province, People's Republic of China.

Administrative division
The town is divided into 55 villages and one community, the following areas: 
 
 Menggongqiao Community
 Dashumiao Village
 Pingdi Village
 Taiyan Village
 Baiyanzhai Village
 Shechong Village
 Jinjia Village
 Taoxi Village
 Jianshan Village
 Dongxia Village
 Xingliao Village
 Yuanjing Village
 Changpo Village
 Lutian Village
 Laoping Village
 Tangxia Village
 Taiyang Village
 Zhenitang Village
 Xingguang Village
 Qiatou Village
 Qiaotouwan Village
 Xiaomen Village
 Gaocang Village
 Jilong Village
 Jiufeng Village
 Peixi Village
 Shi'ao Village
 Fengmu Village
 Huani Village
 Mingxing Village
 Hongxing Village
 Fujia Village
 Menggong Village
 Shilong Village
 Taiping Village
 Yuetang Village
 Qingshui Village
 Changchun Village
 Zilong Village
 Ruiyang Village
 Xingtang Village
 Xinyan Village
 Zhenglong Village
 Jiulong Village
 Shuanglong Village
 Hongguang Village
 Baota Village
 Laowu Village
 Jingjia Village
 Beifeng Village
 Shazhou Village
 Chaofeng Village
 Zanxi Village
 Longxi Village
 Quxishan Village
 Longyuan Village

References

External links

Divisions of Xinhua County